The 1934 National League Division One was the sixth season of motorcycle speedway in Great Britain. It was also the first time that a second division/tier of racing was introduced following the creation of a reserves league.

Summary
Birmingham Bulldogs (formerly Hall Green) and Lea Bridge rejoined the league. Sheffield dropped out and most of their team relocated to Lea Bridge. Clapton Saints, who rode at Lea Bridge's stadium in the previous season relocated and raced as Harringay Tigers for the first time. Crystal Palace relocated to New Cross. Coventry  and Nottingham also dropped out.

Lea Bridge closed down in late July and were replaced by a new side at Walthamstow who took on their last 10 fixtures. 

Belle Vue Aces won their second consecutive double of national title and Knockout Cup. They also completed the treble by winning the A.C.U Cup. Eric Langton of Belle Vue Aces finished with the highest average.

National League Final table

 Lea Bridge scored 8 points from 22 matches, Walthamstow scored 2 from 10

Top Ten Riders

In the 1934 season, a league for reserves and junior riders was introduced. This wasn't continued in 1935. West Ham Reserves won the reserve league dropping just one point in 12 matches.

Reserve League Final table

National Trophy
The 1934 National Trophy was the fourth edition of the Knockout Cup.

First round

Quarterfinals

Semifinals

Final

First leg

Second leg

Belle Vue were National Trophy Champions, winning on aggregate 164-87.

A.C.U Cup
The 1934 Auto-Cycle Union Cup was the first edition of the Cup.

First round

Quarterfinals

Semifinals

Final

See also
List of United Kingdom Speedway League Champions
Knockout Cup (speedway)

References

Speedway National League
1934 in speedway
1934 in British motorsport